The 2015 Stockholm Open (also known as the 2015 If Stockholm Open for sponsorship reasons) was a professional men's tennis tournament played on indoor hard courts.  It was the 47th edition of the tournament, and part of the ATP World Tour 250 series of the 2015 ATP World Tour. It took place at the Kungliga tennishallen in Stockholm, Sweden from 20 to 25 October 2015.

Singles main-draw entrants

Seeds

 1 Rankings are as of October 12, 2015

Other entrants
The following players received wildcards into the singles main draw:
  Tomáš Berdych
  Jarkko Nieminen
  Mikael Ymer

The following players received entry from the qualifying draw:
  Filip Krajinović
  Maximilian Marterer
  Ante Pavić
  Mischa Zverev

The following player received entry as a lucky loser:
  Nicolás Almagro

Withdrawals
Before the tournament
 Daniel Muñoz de la Nava (gastroenteritis) →replaced by Nicolás Almagro

Retirements
 Marcos Baghdatis (right groin injury)
 Steve Darcis (left ankle injury)

Doubles main-draw entrants

Seeds

 Rankings are as of October 12, 2015

Other entrants
The following pairs received wildcards into the doubles main draw:
  Johan Brunström /  Jarkko Nieminen
  Isak Arvidsson /  Fred Simonsson

Withdrawals
During the tournament
  Robert Lindstedt (infection)

Finals

Singles

 Tomáš Berdych defeated  Jack Sock,  7–6(7–1), 6–2

Doubles

  Nicholas Monroe /  Jack Sock defeated  Mate Pavić /  Michael Venus 7–5, 6–2

References

External links
 Official website 

 
Stockholm Open
Stockholm Open
Stockholm Open
2010s in Stockholm